Movies & TV may refer to:

Microsoft Movies & TV
Google TV (service), formerly known as Google Play Movies & TV